Brent A. Syme (born October 23, 1956) is a Canadian curler.

He played at the 1988 Winter Olympics when curling was a demonstration sport, Canadian men's team won bronze medal.

Syme retired from competitive curling in 1988 due to work commitments. 

Outside of curling, Syme is a businessman and was the general manager of the Southern Alberta Curling Association.

Syme also coached the men's 2013 Canadian Masters Curling Championships winning team.

Awards
Canadian Curling Hall of Fame: inducted in 1992 with all Ed Lukowich 1986 team.

Teams

References

External links

Brent Syme – Curling Canada Stats Archive
 Video: 

Living people
1956 births
Curlers from Calgary
Canadian male curlers
Brier champions
Curlers at the 1988 Winter Olympics
Olympic curlers of Canada
Canadian curling coaches
World curling champions